The 2007/2008 season of the Eerste Divisie began in August 2007 and will end in May 2008.

New teams
These teams were relegated from the Eredivisie at the start of the season:
RKC Waalwijk (17th position, relegated after playoffs)
ADO Den Haag (18th position)

Final league standings

Period winners
The competition is divided into six periods of six matches each. The winner of each period qualifies for the playoffs at the end of the season. If the winner of a period has already won a prior period in the season, the second placed team in the period is awarded the playoff slot. If the second placed team has also won a prior period, no winner is called, and the playoff slot is decided by league standing at the end of the season.

Results

Playoffs

Round 1

|}

Round 2 (best of 3)

|}

Round 3 (best of 3)

|}

ADO Den Haag and De Graafschap will play in the 2008–09 Eredivisie.

Top scorers

 Last updated: April 18, 2008

See also
 2007–08 Eredivisie
 2007–08 KNVB Cup

External links
JupilerLeague.nl - Official website Eerste Divisie 

Eerste Divisie seasons
2007–08 in Dutch football
Neth